Vesey Hamilton Island is an island of the Arctic Archipelago, in the territory of Nunavut. It lies in the Hazen Strait, north of Melville Island.

External links 
 Vesey Hamilton Island in the Atlas of Canada - Toporama; Natural Resources Canada

Uninhabited islands of Qikiqtaaluk Region